{{Infobox character
| name = Mother's Milk
| series = The Boys
| color = lime
| image = Mothersmilk.jpg 172596871.jpg
| image_size = 250px
| caption = Mother's Milk as depicted in the comic book series (left; as Baron Wallis) and portrayed in the television series (right; as Marvin T. Milk) by Laz Alonso.
| first = {{Plainlist|
 Comics:
 The Boys #2 (2006)
 Television:
 "Get Some" (2019)}}
| adapted_by = Eric Kripke
| last = Dear Becky #8 (2020)
| creator = Garth EnnisDarick Robertson
| portrayer = Laz AlonsoElias Leon Leacock (young)
| spouse = Unnamed ex-wife (comic series)Monique Milk (ex-wife; television series)
| weapon = Compound V
| nationality = African-American
| species = Supe (comic series)Human (television series)
| full_name = Baron Wallis (comic series)Marvin T. Milk (television series)
| nickname = Mother's MilkM.M. (MM)
| family = 
| children = Janine Wallis (daughter; comic series)Janine Milk (daughter; television series)
| occupation = 
| affiliation = 
| lbl22 = Abilities
| data22 = 
 Skilled in unarmed and armed combat, military tactics, close quarters combat, infiltration, espionage, marksmanship, demolitions, etc.
 Superhuman strength, speed, stamina, durability, smell, and hearing (in comic book version)
 Poison and Toxin Immunity (in comic book version)
 Regenerative Healing Factor (in comic book version)
 Invulnerability (in comic book version)
}}
Mother's Milk, or simply M.M., is a fictional character and antihero in the comic book series The Boys, created by Garth Ennis and Darick Robertson. Born Baron Wallis, he is a member of The Boys, a group of CIA-sponsored vigilantes (led by William "Billy" Butcher) who observe, record, and sometimes liquidate "Supes" (i.e. "superpowered" or "superhuman" individuals, often acting as "superheroes") artificially created by the mega-conglomerate Vought. One of two "Supes" in the group alongside "The Female (of the Species)", Wallis' mother was dosed with the superpower-inducing Compound V while pregnant with him, the result of which was her eventually mutating into a Cthulhu-like creature, and him (and later his daughter Janine) becoming the first naturally-born Supe, prematurely aging (appearing to be in his 40s when in fact in his 20s). To stay alive, Mother's Milk requires continued consumption of his mother's Compound V-enhancing "mother's milk" on a semi-regular basis, leading to him taking the term as a sobriquet and boxing ring name. He later rises to become heavyweight champion of the world following his military career, before being recruited to the Boys after accidentally killing his opponent in the ring, becoming Butcher's second-in-command/best friend over years of missions and befriending Hugh "Wee Hughie" Campbell on his own recruitment. After helping Butcher finally get his revenge on Black Noir, M.M. learns that Butcher plans on killing all Supes and potential Supes (i.e. every person ever exposed to Compound V), including him and his daughter. After confronting Butcher over this (and for having already killed Frenchie, the Female, and M.M's abusive ex-wife), M.M. is smothered to death by Butcher to prevent him from interfering with his plan. In order to avenge her son, M.M.'s mother then gives Hughie the necessary milk to kill Butcher.

The character is primarily portrayed by Laz Alonso in the Amazon Prime Video streaming adaptation while Elias Leon Leacock portrays a young Marvin in the third season. Unlike the comic series, Marvin T. "Mother's" Milk, primarily known as MM, is depicted as a regular human (though still a military veteran) with a dislike of Vought and its Supes resulting from a car crash caused by Soldier Boy in MM's youth, which killed his mother, uncle, and grandfather, and led to his father working himself to death as a lawyer unsuccessfully attempting to sue Vought. In the present storyline, MM joins Butcher and the reformed Boys in exposing the existence of Compound V and taking down Stormfront in the first and second seasons, while in the third season, set two years later, a now-divorced MM rejoins the Boys as they attempt to take down Victoria Neuman and the Homelander, coming to odds with Butcher over his use of V-24 and partnership with a still-alive Soldier Boy (Homelander's father). Mother's Milk's lactophiliac tendencies from the comic series are additionally instead adapted to Homelander (portrayed by Antony Starr) in the television series, while his status as the first naturally-born Supe is adapted to Ryan Butcher (portrayed by Cameron Crovetti). The character has received a positive critical reception.

Appearances
Comic book series
The Boys and Herogasm (2006–2012)

A large, highly patient and methodical African-American man, Mother's Milk first appears in issue #2. Taught by his father to check every possible angle and means of attack, can be somewhat particular (getting annoyed whenever anyone doesn't put a drink coaster under their glasses). He is the only member on the team, aside from the retired Greg Mallory, who is an American citizen by birth. His nickname apparently came about because he is the "purest", i.e. most goodhearted, member of the team. In issue #35, M.M. reveals that he is the only member of the unit to have been exposed to Compound V since conception. His mother worked in a factory that had previously been a Vought-American (VA) laboratory, and hadn't been sanitized afterwards, leading to her being contaminated with Compound V. As a result, his brother Michael was born with severe mental disability and he himself was born needing regular doses of his mother's breast milk to survive. Issue #17 showed him throwing up and feeling disturbed by the constant need. At the same time, he finds the nourishment highly energizing and developing into a breast fetish, adding to his discomfort.

His father worked tirelessly to sue VA over his children's special needs and eventually succeeded, but the experience took a large mental and physical toll on him. M.M. was aware that Vought's lawyers were shrugging the loss off, but never told him. Michael died soon after, killed by the manifestation of his superpowers, and their father died from the stress of trying to sue VA over and over again; his mother was left broken and unwilling to fight anymore, and become morbidly obese; her own powers then expressed themselves thanks to her overwhelming despair, and she now lives in M.M.'s basement, completely unaware of her surroundings. To support his mother and his new wife and daughter, he joined the U.S. Army, volunteered for the Rangers, and became an army heavyweight boxer. In a championship match, M.M.'s powers suddenly manifested and he accidentally killed an opponent in the ring by punching his head off. He was released from the military and was recruited by Butcher and Mallory for the first incarnation of The Boys.

After Mother's Milk had been with The Boys for a year, Butcher accompanied him to rescue M.M.'s infant daughter Janine, whose mother, a drug addict, was incapable of raising her properly. The pair rescued Janine from her mother's then-residence, a drug house whose addicts smoked crack cut with Compound V; Butcher suffered a savage beating from the addicts in the process. M.M. was later present at the destruction of the Brooklyn Bridge (caused by the Seven's attempt to prevent 9/11), where he attempted to help a woman from a falling car; although he maintained his hold on her, she could not get free of her seat belt and was torn in half, dying in M.M.'s arms. The experience would haunt M.M., and serve as additional motivation for continuing the fight against Vought-American.

After the disbanding of the unit, M.M. would go on to perform community work and raise his increasingly rebellious daughter who is now a teenager (and as a result of V, matured early – although she appears 16–17, she's only 12 chronologically); Janine shows M.M. great disrespect but regards Butcher with affection, calling him "Uncle Billy." M.M. has now returned to the team, where he acts as Butcher's second-in-command, possibly (in part) so that he can restrain Butcher from going off the rails in pursuit of their goals. He is one of the few people who receives any consistent level of civility (at least to his face) from the pathologically rude Butcher, who thinks very highly of him. He is also the only member of the Boys (other than Hughie, the new recruit) who thinks that at least a few superheroes might be acting out of genuine altruism (as mentioned in issue #6).

M.M. is the only member of the group that is still in contact with Mallory. He has a great deal of affection for Hughie, which is the principal reason why M.M. ended up at odds with Butcher after discovering that Butcher had been manipulating Hughie into dangerous situations and not informing the rest of the team (#43). This would result in M.M. putting Hughie in contact with Mallory after Hughie's sabbatical.

Later, Mother's Milk discovers that his abusive ex-wife and daughter were in a pornographic film together. He is furious at this revelation, and leaves to deal with this family issue. He told his mother about it, and it is implied she did not take the news well, as she is screaming, locked up in a basement. M.M. then gets a call from his daughter. She tells him that she was not in her right mind, and has run away from her mother. Mother's Milk attempts to get her location, but she states that she wants to be left alone, and when she's well, she will call him back to let him know. He tracks her down easily, and she reveals that Butcher murdered the producers and cast of the adult film, including brutally murdering Janine's mother in front of her. His final words, meant both as a warning and as a threat, were for Janine to leave M.M. alone.

Mother's Milk finished having a meeting with The Boys on stopping Butcher from using a weaponized version of the "V" compound on the rest of the Supes and the innocents that were affected. Butcher walks in on Mother's Milk, questioning why he wasn't trying to fix his issues with his daughter, thinking that would get him out of the picture for good. M.M. questions if Butcher is really going through with the plan. Butcher responds with a yes and states that he did not think he was going to survive the fight with Homelander and Black Noir. Butcher offers him a chance to walk away, but instead they fight each other. Butcher reveals to him that he thought of killing his mother as well. Despite being enraged, Mother's Milk stated he never wanted it to go down like this. Butcher replies that he knows and that he was a best mate that he could ever know, and did not deserve to know him. Before Mother's Milk can land a decisive blow, Butcher pulls out a grenade and stuffs it into Mother's Milk's mouth as it explodes. Left in a critical condition, his face blown off, Mother's Milk deliriously attempts to call out for his mother as Butcher suffocates and kills him, while stating that he has "no mates".

After Hughie realizes what Butcher is doing, he pays a visit to M.M.'s mother after his death, discovering she has grown into an enormous Cthulhu-like blob creature; her breasts have elongated to tentacles (explaining why M.M. displays nausea when snakes are described by a nature show in an earlier issue) and she seems only able to say "MY BOY..." when she spots Hughie, apparently not realizing he is not her son. When she grabs him with one tentacle and presents another with a distended nipple at the end, Hughie consents to drink, possibly hoping the milk will strengthen him (he is unable to keep it down, however), and manages to stop Butcher from enacting his plan, killing him before toasting to the memory of M.M. and the fallen Boys.

Dear Becky (2020)
Set twelve years after Butcher's and M.M's deaths, "Dear Becky" sees Hughie being sent Butcher's diary by an unknown individual, leading him to confront his past actions and killing Butcher. Hughie reads through the diary which delves into Butcher's moral justifications and darker work with Boys (including M.M.) prior to Hughie's own recruitment, including when they had tortured and cut out the tongue of a child (a parody of Billy Batson / Captain Marvel) to prevent them from ever being able to return to their Supe form.

Television series
The Boys (2019–present)
In the streaming television series adaptation, Laz Alonso portrays the character. Unlike the comic series, M.M. is not a Supe, and his real name is Marvin T. Milk instead of Baron Wallis, with his "Mother's Milk" nickname originating his surname and "mothering" nature as a battlefield medic, and his father's campaign against Vought originating from Soldier Boy throwing a Mercedes-Benz into the Milk family household when MM was a child, killing his grandfather, which Vought had then covered up by claiming Soldier Boy's actions were caused by apprehending car thieves. MM serves as the Boys' second-in-command, holding Billy Butcher back from his darker impulses. Elias Leon Leacock portrays young MM in the third season. MM's mother's prehensile breast tentacle attack against Wee Hughie in the comic series is also adapted as a penis tentacle attack from Love Sausage against MM in the second season.

Death Battle! (2020)
In the 2020 Amazon Prime Video-sponsored The Boys promotional episodes of Death Battle!, the "ruthless" Mother's Milk is depicted via archive footage of Laz Alonso from the series' first season as Death Battle!'' hosts Wiz & Boomstick discuss the Boys and the Seven with Black Noir, prior to the Seven's simulated battle royale.

Powers and abilities
Mother's Milk is a physically fit former boxer and United States Army Ranger later employed by the CIA, one of the only naturally-born Supes, resulting from his mother being exposed to large quantities of the enhancement drug Compound V, granting him superhuman levels of strength and durability which allow him to casually injure and kill regular humans as well as "Supe" superhumans. Despite this strength, Mother's Milk requires the regular consumption of his mother's Compound V-infused breast milk — from which he took his sobriquet — lest his powers diminish and his physical body begin to break down and degrade, with him and his daughter prematurely aging, Mother's Milk appearing to be in his 40s despite being in his late 20s, and his 12-year-old daughter Janine physically appearing to be in their late teens/early 20s. In the Amazon Prime Video streaming television adaptation, Mother's Milk is instead depicted as a regular human, opposed to Butcher's use of the temporary superpower-inducing V-24 in the third season.

Development
Mother's Milk was conceived of as a subversive parody of how "the scary black man" was written in DC and Marvel Comics in the 1980s and 1990s, of the "crack babies, of the ’80s, [who were] physically infected with an addiction to [Compound] V", echoing Billy Butcher's origins as a parody of The Punisher. The character was originally owned by DC Comics for its first volume until the rights were reverted to Dynamite Entertainment.

Following the story arc where the corrupt superhero problems are dealt with and Homelander and the Seven are defeated, M.M. and the other members of The Boys are betrayed and murdered by Billy Butcher to prevent them from interfering in his plans to eliminate all Supes and potential Supes in the world, establishing him as the final antagonist of the series. The last surviving member, Hughie Campbell, enraged by this act of betrayal, and empowered with Compound V provided by M.M.'s mother, paralyses Butcher, who then convinces Hughie to kill him with a glass shard instead of imprisoning him by tricking Hughie into believing that Butcher had killed his parents. Despite dying, Butcher praises Hughie and dies with a smile on face, and Hughie tells Annie that Butcher is probably fighting in Hell, before toasting to the deceased Boys (the Female, Frenchie, and M.M.).

Addressing his depiction of Mother's Milk in the Amazon Prime Video streaming television adaptation as having obsessive-compulsive disorder (OCD), his portrayer Laz Alonso confirmed that it was adapted to the series due to Alonso's own OCD diagnosis, stating that:

"The OCD part, that stuff to me allows us to really have a real conversation about mental health and how untreated mental health can affect us. It also shows that even though Mother's Milk is the one who we know has mental health issues with OCD, he also shines a light on how everything that's happening in the world affects everyone's mental health, including all of the members of The Boys. He's almost like a mirror that holds up how we're all traumatized and we're all just coping with trauma. And we have to be very careful because the very things that we hate, we can end up turning into them if we don't watch ourselves."

Reception
Laz Alonso's depiction of Mother's Milk / M.M. in the Amazon Prime Video streaming television adaptation has been positively received, and his interpersonal relationships with Billy Butcher (portrayed by Karl Urban), Frenchie (portrayed by Tomer Capone), and Hughie Campbell (portrayed by Jack Quaid) have been praised.

References

The Boys characters
Characters created by Garth Ennis
Comics characters introduced in 2006
DC Comics characters who can move at superhuman speeds
DC Comics characters with accelerated healing
DC Comics characters with superhuman strength
Dynamite Entertainment characters
Fictional African-American people
Fictional boxers
Fictional Central Intelligence Agency personnel
Fictional characters with obsessive–compulsive disorder
Fictional characters with superhuman senses
Fictional murderers of children
Fictional combat medics
Fictional mass murderers
Fictional milkmen
Fictional United States Army personnel
Fictional United States Marine Corps personnel
Fictional war veterans
Male characters in television
Television characters introduced in 2018
Vigilante characters in comics
WildStorm characters